Erbium tetraboride is a boride of the lanthanide metal erbium.

It is hard and has a high melting point. Industrial applications of erbium boride include use in semiconductors, the blades of gas turbines, and the nozzles of rocket engines.

References

Borides
Erbium compounds